The Martyrology of 411 is the oldest Eastern Christian martyrology. It is written in Syriac and preserved in one of the oldest Syriac manuscripts, British Library, Add MS 12150, dated to November 411.

Despite its early date, the Martyrology of 411 does not stand at the head of the eastern martyrological tradition. Rather, it is related to the western tradition as represented in the Martyrologium Hieronymianum. It is a translation of a Greek martyrology of about 362, which was also used as a source for the Martyrologium Hieronymianum. The latest saints included date from the reign of Julian the Apostate (361–363) and may be later additions not found in the original Greek text.

The martyrology is divided into two lists of "martyrs of the West" and "martyrs of the East". The western list is arranged by day and month of the year, beginning with Saint Stephen on 26 December and ending with Peter of Alexandria on 24 November. The eastern list contains the victims of the Forty-Year Persecution of Shah Shapur II of the Sasanian Empire. It is arranged not by date but by position in the Church of the East.

Notes

Bibliography

411
Martyrologies
Texts in Syriac